Aleksandar "Aljoša" Mitrović (Serbian Cyrillic: Александар "Аљоша" Митровић; born July 22, 1990) is a Serbian professional basketball player.

Professional career
On 16 February 2015, he signed with Rabotnički of the Macedonian First League. On 10 May 2015, he parted ways with Rabotnički.

In January 2018, he signed with Dinamo Tbilisi of the Georgian Superliga. In 2018, he signed with Al-Khtot Al-Jawiya. Mitrović spent the 2019-20 season with Abha Club of the Saudi Premier League, averaging 24.4 points per game. On 8 November 2020, he signed with Borac Banja Luka. He played three games for the team, averaging 6.7 points. On 13 November 2020, Mitrović signed with Al-Ittihad Club (Bahrain) of the Bahraini Premier League. On January 26 2021, he signed with Al-Muharraq SC (Bahrain) of the Bahraini Premier League. On October 27 2021, he signed with Taoyuan Leopards of the T1 League. He was injured during the 2021–22 T1 League season and left the team in April 2022.

References

External links
 Aleksandar Mitrović at aba-liga.com
 Aleksandar Mitrović at euroleague.net
 Aleksandar Mitrović at eurobasket.com
 Aleksandar Mitrović at fiba.com

1990 births
Living people
ABA League players
Basketball League of Serbia players
Basketball players from Belgrade
KK Budućnost players
KK Mega Basket players
KK Metalac Valjevo players
KK Mladost Zemun players
KK Partizan players
KK Vršac players
OKK Borac players
Peristeri B.C. players
Serbian expatriate basketball people in Bulgaria
Serbian expatriate basketball people in Bosnia and Herzegovina
Serbian expatriate basketball people in Georgia (country)
Serbian expatriate basketball people in Greece
Serbian expatriate basketball people in Iraq
Serbian expatriate basketball people in Montenegro
Serbian expatriate basketball people in North Macedonia
Serbian expatriate basketball people in Taiwan
Serbian expatriate basketball people in Qatar
Serbian expatriate basketball people in Saudi Arabia
Serbian expatriate basketball people in Slovenia
Serbian men's basketball players
Shooting guards
Small forwards
Taoyuan Leopards players
T1 League imports